Poonilamazha is a 1997 Indian Malayalam film written and directed by Sunil. The film was produced by Bindu and Nisha under the banner of Ponthara Films and distributed by Fax Release. It stars Sanjay Mitra and Shraddha Nigam in the lead roles. This was the first ever Malayalam film shot in the Seychelles.

Cast

Soundtrack 
The film's soundtrack contains 7 songs, all composed by Bollywood composer duo Laxmikant–Pyarelal. Lyrics by Gireesh Puthenchery, Sameer.

References

External links
 

1997 films
1990s Malayalam-language films
Films directed by Sunil
Films scored by Laxmikant–Pyarelal